Catherine II, also Catherine of Valois or Catherine of Taranto (before 15 April 1303 – October 1346), was the recognised Latin Empress of Constantinople from 1307–1346, although she lived in exile and only had authority over Crusader States in Greece. She was Princess consort of Achaea and Taranto, and also regent of Achaea from 1332–1341, and Governor of Cephalonia from 1341–1346.

Life
She was born in 1303, sometime before 15 April, the eldest daughter of Charles, count of Valois, and Catherine I.

Her mother was recognized as Empress of the Latin Empire of Constantinople by the Latin states in Greece, despite the city having been captured by the Empire of Nicaea in 1261. Catherine inherited her claims as the titular Empress on 11 October 1307. She was still a child and remained in the custody of her father, who managed her claims to the empire until his death in 1325.

An early betrothal to Hugh of Burgundy, made on 15 April 1303 when she was an infant, was renounced in 1312.

Naples

In July 1313, Catherine married Philip I of Taranto, King of Albania and Prince of Achaea, who was the younger brother of Robert, King of Naples. She associated her husband as titular Emperor (Philip II), and retained the claim to the empire after his death on 23 December 1332. Robert, his eldest surviving son, succeeded him as Prince of Taranto in 1331. Catherine became influential at the court of Naples.

Her court was more worldly than the pious court of King Robert and his pious wife, Sancha of Majorca. During the reign of her niece, Joanna I of Naples, she opposed the marriage of Joan's younger sister, Maria of Calabria, to Charles, Duke of Durazzo. This was because Maria was heir presumptive to the throne of Naples, and the Durazzos were rivals to her own family. She and her family were compensated with a cash settlement from the royal treasury.

Achaea

In 1333, her son Robert received the Principality of Achaea through an agreement with his uncle, John of Gravina. However, the thirteen-year-old boy was deemed too young to reign alone, and his mother became his co-ruler for the rest of her life. Initially ruling through appointed baillis, in summer 1338 Catherine mustered a fleet and took her whole household to Achaea, where she took an active part in its government.  She gave refuge to Nikephoros II Orsini of Epirus, and supported him in his attempt to assert himself in his land against the Byzantine Emperor Andronikos III Palaiologos.

Final Years

Her presence in Achaea was no longer needed by the time Robert reached adulthood in 1341. She became Governor of Cephalonia and spent the last five years of her life in this responsibility. After the murder of Joan's husband, Andrew of Hungary, Joan sought a new husband amongst her Taranto cousins. Catherine supported her younger son, Louis of Taranto, against her older son, Robert. She sheltered Charles of Artois, a bastard son of Robert the Wise, and his son Bertrand, who were both suspected of complicity. When asked to give them up, she refused and stated she would punish them herself if they were guilty.

She died in Naples in October 1346. Queen Joan organized her funeral at the church of San Domenico.

Issue
By Philip I of Taranto, Catherine II had four children:
 Margaret (c. 1325–1380), married Francis of Baux, Duke of Andria. By Francis, she was the mother of James of Baux, Prince of Achaea and titular Emperor of Constantinople.
 Robert (1326–1364), Prince of Taranto, titular Emperor of Constantinople (as Robert II).
 Louis (1327/28–1362), Prince of Taranto and King of Naples by right of his wife.
 Philip II (1329–1374), Prince of Taranto and Achaea, titular Emperor of Constantinople (as Philip III).

Ancestry

Notes

References
Guida Myrl Jackson-Laufer, Women Rulers Throughout the Ages: An Illustrated Guide, ABC-CLIO, 1999.

External links 
Catherine listed among other influential women of her time

1303 births
1346 deaths
14th-century Latin Emperors of Constantinople
House of Valois
House of Anjou-Taranto
Latin Empresses of Constantinople
Princesses of Taranto
14th-century women rulers
14th-century French people
14th-century French women
Empresses regnant